Rajasekhar may refer to:
 Rajasekhar (actor), Indian actor
 Rajasekhar (director), Indian film director and producer

See also 
 S. Rajasekar, Indian cinematographer, screenwriter, film director and actor
 Rajashekhara (Sanskrit poet), a Sanskrit poet
 S. Rajasekharan (born 1946), literary critic and poet